Cristián Hernán Sánchez (born 2 October 1991) is an Argentine professional footballer who plays as a midfielder for Defensores de Belgrano.

Career
Sánchez played the early years of his career with Tiro Federal and ADIUR. In 2014, Sánchez joined Central Córdoba of Primera C Metropolitana on loan. He remained for four years, netting fifteen goals across one hundred and forty-two appearances. On 30 June 2018, Sánchez was loaned to Primera B Metropolitana side All Boys. He made his debut versus San Miguel on 18 August, before scoring his first goal against Defensores Unidos on 8 September.

Career statistics
.

References

External links

1991 births
Living people
People from Rosario Department
Argentine footballers
Association football midfielders
Primera C Metropolitana players
Primera B Metropolitana players
Tiro Federal footballers
Central Córdoba de Rosario footballers
All Boys footballers
San Martín de San Juan footballers
Defensores de Belgrano footballers
Sportspeople from Santa Fe Province